Tan Lee Peng (born 22 August 1965), known professionally as Chen Liping, is a Singaporean actress managed under Hype Records.

Career
Chen began her acting career in 1985 with the Singapore Broadcasting Corporation after completing the drama training course. She is best known for her role as "Miss Ai-Yo-Yo" in the Singapore Chinese drama series Good Morning, Sir!, which earned her a "Most Unforgettable TV Character" Award in Star Awards 2003. Her character was also voted the most memorable character at MediaCorp Channel 8's 45th anniversary special in 2008 and the top 5 most memorable characters poll at the Star Awards 2007 anniversary special celebrating 25 years of Chinese language drama in Singapore.

In 2003, Chen won her first Best Actress Award for her role in Holland V. She was also the sixth MediaCorp artiste to be awarded the All-Time Favourite Artiste in the annual Star Awards after winning the Top 10 Most Popular Award 10 times since the awards inception in 1994. She won the Best Actress Award for the second time in Star Awards 2010 for her role as a thrifty housewife in Reunion Dinner. In 2014, Chen won the Best Actress award once again for her role as Yao Zhu Kang Li, a successful career woman in the media industry facing marital issues in The Dream Makers.

In 2017, She has wrapped up a drama called Mightiest Mother-in-Law and followed by a long form drama, Life Less Ordinary along with Bonnie Loo, Jeffrey Xu, Xiang Yun & others.

In 2018, she has wrapped up a drama called Say Cheese along with Joanne Peh. She is currently wrapped a dialect drama called How Are You and currently filming a long form drama, Old is Gold along with Rui En, Xu Bin, Bonnie Loo & others which will be shown in 2019.

In March 2023, Chen portrayed her first English drama role in the second season of Titoudao, a televised drama adaptation of a stageplay with the same title.

Personal life
Chen attended Crescent Girls' School from 1978 to 1983. She married fellow actor Rayson Tan in 1998, and they have a son named Zavier (born 2002).

Filmography

Awards and nominations

References

External links
 Chen Li Ping's portfolio on SBC
 Profile on xin.msn.com

Singaporean television actresses
Singaporean film actresses
20th-century Singaporean actresses
21st-century Singaporean actresses
1965 births
Singaporean people of Teochew descent
Living people